The Running Jumping & Standing Still Film is a 1959 British sketch comedy short film directed by Richard Lester and Peter Sellers, in collaboration with Bruce Lacey. The film was released in 1959.

It was filmed over two Sundays in 1959, at a cost of around £70 (including £5 for the rental of a field).

It was nominated for an Academy Award, but did not win. It was a favourite of The Beatles, which led to Lester being hired to direct A Hard Day's Night and then Help!, in which Lacey makes a guest appearance as George Harrison's gardener in the sequence where the group arrive at their 'home'.

The short film has been made available as a special feature on several home video releases of A Hard Day's Night. It is also featured in The Unknown Peter Sellers and a BFI released collection of rarely seen films from Bruce Lacey's career entitled The Lacey Rituals. It is also included as a special feature of the StudioCanal issue of I'm All Right Jack.

Synopsis
The short consists of a series of surreal vignettes which transpire in the English countryside and involve a rotating array of protagonists. It begins with a man watching through a telescope how an old woman cleans a meadow with a rag and bucket. Other examples are a photographer who tries to develop a film in the water of a lake after wrapping a black piece of cloth around his head, or an athlete who is performing push-ups and is then used as the seat for the model of a portrait painter. The model has numbers on her face which the painter uses to choose the correct colors from his palette. The same athlete later throws a hammer, which is then shot down like a skeet shooting target by a hunter. The film ends with a man wearing a top hat and one boxing glove knocking out another man he had been luring for a long time. The man then enters a hut, undresses, puts the boxing glove back on and goes to sleep, turning off the light.

Cast
Richard Lester
Peter Sellers
Spike Milligan
Mario Fabrizi
Bruce Lacey
David Lodge
Leo McKern
Norman Rossington
Graham Stark

Critical reception
BFI Screenonline concluded that the film's lasting legacy "was its influence (as part of Milligan's overall body of work) on British comedy in general, and on Monty Python's Flying Circus (BBC, 1969–74) in particular. This is evident not only in its surreal humour, but in the way that elements of one routine are threaded through subsequent scenes, transcending the stand-alone sketch form—a tactic subsequently favoured by the Python team." Empire magazine called it "Sublime slapstick surrealism."

See also
 List of avant-garde films of the 1950s

References

External links 

 

1959 films
1959 comedy films
Films directed by Peter Sellers
Films directed by Richard Lester
1959 short films
Surreal comedy films
Surrealist films
British comedy short films
1960s English-language films
1950s English-language films
1950s British films